The Do Hezar River is a river of Mazandaran Province in northern Iran.

It flows northward through the Central Alborz mountain range, eventually combining with the Se Hazar River before flowing into the Caspian Sea as the Cheshmeh Kileh River.

Central Alborz mountain range map
The Do Hezar River is #3 in the upper left corner of the map.

Rivers of Mazandaran Province
Tributaries of the Cheshmeh Kileh River